Cesare Bortolotti (1950–1990) was an Italian entrepreneur that was formerly the president of Atalanta B.C from 1980 to 1990.

Life 

Son of Achille in 1980 he was named president of Atalanta, the team was playing in Serie B, the next season the team was relegated in Serie C1. In the following years the team was soon promoted in the highest leagues and in June 1985 Atalanta reached the Serie A.
During his tenure as president Atalanta reached the semifinal of European Cup Winners where Atalanta was defeated by Malines.
In 1990, he was killed in a car accident near his house on the shore of Lake of Iseo.

References 

1950 births
Businesspeople from Bergamo
Italian football chairmen and investors
People in the petroleum industry
Italian industrialists
1990 deaths